The squirrel is a rodent in the family Sciuridae.

Squirrel or squirrels may also refer to:

Animals
 Scaly-tailed squirrels (Anomaluridae), a group of African rodents unrelated to true (Sciuridae) squirrels
 Squirrel monkey

Computing 
Squirrel (DHT), a web-caching system
Squirrel (programming language)
SQuirreL SQL Client, a database administration tool
Yahoo Squirrel, former name of Yahoo Together, a messaging app by Yahoo

People
Julian Edelman (b. 1986), American NFL football player
Robert "Squirrel" Lester (1942–2010), member of the singing group The Chi-Lites
Leonard Squirrell (1893–1979), English artist

Places
Squirrel, Idaho, an unincorporated community
Squirrel Creek, California
Squirrel Creek, in Spitler Woods State Natural Area, Illinois
Squirrel Island, Maine
Squirrel Lake, Nova Scotia, Canada
Squirrel River, Alaska
The Squirrels (Highland Falls, New York), an estate on the National Register of Historic Places

Music
"The Squirrel", composed by Sir George Thomas Smart (1776–1867)
"The Squirrel", a 1951 jazz standard composed by Tadd Dameron
The Squirrel (album), an album by Dexter Gordon recorded in 1967
The Squirrels, a Seattle pop band
Squirrel Records, a UK-based record company in the 1990s

Theatre and TV
Squirrels (play), a 1974 play by David Mamet
The Squirrels (TV series), a 1970s UK sitcom
"Squirrels", an episode of the television series Teletubbies

Other uses
HMS Squirrel, 11 Royal Navy ships
Squirrel (debate), debating jargon
Squirrel (horse), a British thoroughbred racehorse
Squirrel (peanut butter), a Canadian brand of peanut butter
Squirrel (personal finance company)
Squirrel, a post-World War I motorcycle produced by The Scott Motorcycle Company
Squirrel Scouts (disambiguation), various youth organisations
 Eurocopter AS350 Écureuil (Squirrel), a light transport helicopter

See also

 
 
 Squirreling, Scientolgy jargon for splinter groups
 Sqrl (disambiguation)
 Sqrrl